"Epic Theatre" is the live extended play by Australia rock singer-songwriter and guitarist, Deborah Conway. The EP was recorded over two Athenaeum shows in Melbourne on 13 and 14 May 1994, during the promotional tour of the Bitch Epic album.

The album was released individually and as a double pack with the Bitch Epic album.

Track listing
 "Buried Treasure" (Conway)
 "Madame Butterfly is in Trouble" (Conway)
 "Parabasis"	(Conway/Zygier)
 "Will You Miss Me When You're Sober" (Conway)
 "White Roses" (Conway/Bray)
 "Get Stripped" (Zygier)
 "String of Pearls" (Conway)
 "Today I am a Daisy" (Conway/Zygier)

References

Live EPs
EPs by Australian artists
1994 EPs
Deborah Conway albums
Mushroom Records albums